Lilly is a feminine given name which is borne by:

People
Lilly Becher (1901–1978), German writer, journalist and activist
Lilly Bølviken (1914–2011), Norwegian judge
Lilly Daché (1898–1989), French milliner and fashion designer
Lilly Engström (1843–1921), Swedish pedagogue and women's rights activist 
Lilly Hellström (1866–1930),  Swedish schoolteacher and newspaper editor
Lilly Kahil (1926 - 2002), Swiss-French archaeologist and classicist 
Lilly Kilvert (born 1953), American production designer
Lilly Ledbetter (born 1938), American activist
Lilly Ogatina Valahoe Poznanski (1942 - 1989), politician from Solomon Islands
Lilly Pulitzer (1931–2013), American socialite and fashion designer
Lilly Reich (1885–1947), German furniture designer
Lilly Rivlin, Israeli journalist and writer
Lilly Scholz (1903–?), Austrian pair skater
Lilly Singh (born 1988), Canadian YouTuber
Lilly Steinschneider (1891–1975), Hungarian aviator
Lilly Tartikoff (born 1953), American activist
Lilly Téllez, Mexican journalist
Lilly Martin Spencer (1822–1902), American painter
Lilly Wust (1913–2006), German housewife

Fictional characters
Lilly the Witch the titular character of the series of the same name
Lilly Chillman, Yellow Ranger in Power Rangers Jungle Fury
Lilly Harper, a character from I'll Fly Away
Lilly Kane, a character in the television series Veronica Mars
Lilly Kane (The King of Fighters), a character in the arcade game series The King of Fighters
Lilly, a character in the video game Grandia
Lilly Satou, a character in the visual novel Katawa Shoujo
Lilly Sinclair, a character in the American television sitcom Bosom Buddies
Lilly Truscott, a character in the television series Hannah Montana

See also
Lily (name)
Lillie (name)
Lili (given name) 

Feminine given names
English feminine given names
Given names derived from plants or flowers